Adventure Construction Set (ACS) is a computer game creation system written by Stuart Smith that is used to construct tile-based graphical adventure games. ACS was originally published by Electronic Arts (EA) in 1984 on the Commodore 64, and was later ported to the Apple II, Amiga, and DOS.  It was one of EA's biggest hits of 1985, earning a Software Publishers Association "Gold Disk" award.

ACS provides a graphical editor for the construction of maps, placement of creatures and items, and a simple menu-based scripting to control game logic.  A constructed game is stored on its own disk which can be copied and shared with friends. For some ports (such as Amiga) the ACS software is still needed to play user-constructed games.

Included with the system is a complete game, Rivers of Light, based on the Epic of Gilgamesh. It features art by Smith and Connie Goldman and music by Dave Warhol. The Amiga version of ACS has art by Greg Johnson and Avril Harrison and an additional pre-made adventure called "Galactic Agent" by Ken St. Andre.

Titles influenced by ACS include The Elder Scrolls Construction Set. Project lead Todd Howard had stated, "When we started Morrowind, I was really excited about making a tool like 'Stuart Smith's Adventure Construction Set for the Apple 2'. I even used part of the name."

Gameplay
Gameplay features of Adventure Construction Set include:
Turn-based system.
Up to four players may play.
A player character can be imported from another adventure. However the character might not retain the same graphic tile if the new adventure uses a different tile set.
Music and sound.
Random encounters.
Spells.
Range and melee combat.
Along with graphic tiles, text screens are also available for conveying information.
Creatures which behave as player-mimics, copying various traits and equipment of the player.
Shops.

Construction system

Adventure Construction Set was designed to make tile-based graphical adventure games similar to author Stuart Smith's earlier games Return of Heracles and Ali Baba and the Forty Thieves.

The framework of an adventure built within ACS is organized into the following main categories:
"World map": This is the top-level map from which characters begin their adventure. The world map differs from other playable areas of the game in that it has no fixed creature encounters, no stacked tiles, quicker movement, it is scrollable, and it optionally may wrap around (have no borders.) Random encounters may occur on the world map, during which the game switches to a special view similar to a "room" to handle the encounter.
"Regions": A region is a collection of rooms. A region is a construction concept and does not present itself to the player, except by indirect means such as disk access when traveling between regions.
"Rooms": A room is a rectangular, tiled area of a size which must fit within the game's viewport. Tiles may be used to make a room look like shapes other than rectangular.
"Things": A thing is a background tile, obstacle, or collectible item.
"Creatures"
"Pictures": These are art assets used by the tiles. For some platforms, four colors are available for images. For the Amiga platform, 32 colors are available, each of which can be assigned to be any of 4096 available colors.

Tiles may be stacked. Only the top tile of a stack may be directly interacted with by the player, however special tiles allow for game-logic to be implemented via the stack. For example, a tile may be set to "Activate All Things at This Place". Tiles may also allow or disallow interaction based on the contents of the player's inventory, or activate if a specific object is dropped on top of the stack.

Spell-effects may be attached to Things.

The game allows for somewhat varied monster AI behavior. A creature may be specified to behave solely as a "fighter" or "slinker", or adjust its temperament based on its condition. In addition, it may be specified as either an "enemy", "friend", "neutral", or "thief", with a total of 8 possible behavioral patterns expressed.

There are maximum quotas applied to most categories in the game (including the total number of unique things, text messages, pictures, regions, creatures per region, things per region, and rooms per region.) These limits restrict the size of adventures. For example, "Each adventure can contain up to 15 regions and each region can contain up to 16 rooms."

ACS included a framework for fantasy adventures, as well as starter toolkits for fantasy, futurist, and "spy" game genres.

Auto-Construct Feature
Along with user-constructed adventures, the software can also auto-construct a random adventure. This feature can optionally be used to auto-complete a partially built adventure. The user may specify numerous parameters for auto-generation, including difficulty level.

Development

Smith denied that his software was inspired by Pinball Construction Set. Stuart stated that the concept was based on his experience writing accounting software, during which he developed a report generator that would create a standalone COBOL program, and that Electronic Arts suggested the name Adventure Construction Set. ACS was produced by Don Daglow in parallel with the development of Racing Destruction Set.

Reception
Orson Scott Card criticized Adventure Construction Sets user interface, stating that it "was designed by the Kludge Monster from the Nethermost Hell". He praised the game's flexibility, however, reporting that his son was able to create a spell called "Summon Duck". Computer Gaming Worlds Scorpia described ACS as an "easy-to-use, albeit time-consuming, means of creating a graphic adventure."

Reviews
 Casus Belli #35 (Dec 1986)

Community

Electronic Arts contest
Shortly after Adventure Construction Set's release, announcements were included in the packaging for players to submit their adventures for a contest to be judged by Electronic Arts and their playtesters. Approximately 50 games were submitted and winners chosen for three categories:

Fantasy - Festival by R.C. Purrenhage written for the Commodore 64
Science Fiction - Cosmos by Albert Jerng written for the C-64
Contemporary - Panama by Will Bryant for the C-64 and Codename:Viper by Peter Schroeder for the Apple II

Adventure Construction Set Club
The supplementary manual included with the Amiga port mentions, "If you're an ACS fanatic you can join the Adventure Construction Set Club. Club members receive access to a library of adventures created with ACS" The supplementary manual also mentions that the club is not affiliated with Electronic Arts.

See also
 Music Construction Set
 Pinball Construction Set
 Racing Destruction Set
 The Quill (software)

References

External links

Adventure Construction Set at AmigaMemo.com - Amiga.Game.Museum
Review of C64 version from 1985
Adventure Creation Kit - remake of Adventure Construction Set

1984 video games
Adventure games
Amiga games
Apple II games
Ariolasoft games
Commodore 64 games
DOS games
Electronic Arts games
Multiplayer and single-player video games
Video games with tile-based graphics
Video game development software